Jane Park (born December 15, 1986) is an American professional golfer who plays on the LPGA Tour. Before turning professional, Park reached the finals of the 2003 U.S. Women's Amateur and 2004 U.S. Girls' Junior, and won the 2004 U.S. Women's Amateur. She also tied for low amateur at the 2006 U.S. Women's Open. Since joining the LPGA in 2007, she has earned over $2.8 million and recorded 16 top-10 finishes.

Early life and amateur career
Born in Chicago, Illinois, on December 15, 1986, Park began to play golf when she was 11 years old, and later resided in Rancho Cucamonga, California. In August 2003, 16-year-old Park reached the finals of the U.S. Women's Amateur, where she lost to Virada Nirapathpongporn 2 and 1. The following year, Park made it to the finals of the U.S. Girls' Junior Championship, where she faced Julieta Granada. After the 18-hole match finished all square, Granada won on the second extra hole. Three weeks later, Park won the U.S. Women's Amateur Championship, defeating Amanda McCurdy 2-up in the title match.

In addition to her three appearances in USGA event finals, Park played on the U.S. Curtis Cup team in 2004 and 2006 and the UCLA Bruins college team in 2005, when she was a first-team All-American. Following a tie for 10th at the 2006 U.S. Women's Open, which was tied for the highest finish by an amateur that year, she turned professional in August 2006.

Professional career
At the 2006 LPGA Final Qualifying Tournament in December, Park tied for 18th place, outside the top 15, which only secured her non-exempt (conditional) status on the LPGA Tour for 2007. With a partial LPGA schedule, she spent time on the Futures Tour developmental circuit in 2007. After finishing 109th on the LPGA Tour money list, Park returned to the Final Qualifying Tournament in December, where she won with a 17-under-par total and gained full playing privileges on the LPGA Tour for 2008.

During her first full season on the LPGA Tour, Park won over $630,000 to finish 29th on the 2008 money list. In 26 events, she recorded four top-10 finishes, including ties for second at the SBS Open at Turtle Bay and P&G Beauty NW Arkansas Championship. In 2009, Park had two top-10 finishes in 19 events; a sixth-place tie at the HSBC Women's Champions was her highest finish of the season. Park did not have a top-20 finish in the 2010 season, earning $78,572 for the year. In 2011, Park's earnings fell to $42,261, and she again had no top-20 finishes during the season.

Following a 2012 in which she missed the cut in more than half of her 15 events played, Park had a pair of top-10 finishes in 2013 and over $260,000 in earnings; her ranking of 51st on the LPGA money list was her highest in five years. Her 2014 earnings were just over half of the amount she made in 2013, though she made the cut in 11 of her 16 tournaments. Park's 2015 season included two top-10 finishes, and her season earnings topped $300,000. Her highest finish was a tie for fifth at the U.S. Women's Open, a tournament in which she held a share of the lead after one round. In 2016, she earned over $165,000, finishing 84th on the money list. Park's top finish of the season was a tie for 12th at the Evian Championship. The following year, Park's earnings exceeded $340,000, more than doubling her 2016 total. At the Canadian Women's Open, she had her highest finish of the season, a tie for eighth place; in her next tournament, the Portland Classic, she posted her second and final top-10 result in 2017, tying for ninth.

Park tied for fourth at the 2018 Kia Classic, her best LPGA Tour result in a decade. For the season, she earned almost $300,000 and was 65th on the money list. The Kia Classic was the only tournament in which Park finished in the top 10 in 2018. In 2019, she fell nine spots to 74th in earnings, which totaled over $200,000. Park had three top-10 results in 19 tournaments that season. At the Ladies Scottish Open, she shot a 63 in the first round and ended the day as a co-leader, on her way to a tie for ninth. She later finished tied for seventh at the Portland Classic, and at the Volunteers of America Classic she tied for fourth. In 2020, Park made two cuts in three events played; a tie for 25th at the Women's Australian Open was her highest finish. She made three of 10 cuts in 2021; her only top-60 finish was a tie for 13th at the LPGA Mediheal Championship.

Personal life
In 2017, Park married Pete Godfrey, a caddie who has worked for LPGA Tour players Ariya Jutanugarn, Jang Ha-na, and Lydia Ko.

Results in LPGA majors
Results not in chronological order before 2019.

^ The Evian Championship was added as a major in 2013

LA = Low amateur
CUT = missed the half-way cut
WD = withdrew
NT = no tournament
"T" = tied

Source:

Summary

Most consecutive cuts made – 4 (twice)
Longest streak of top-10s – 1 (twice)

LPGA Tour career summary

 official through the 2021 season

U.S. national team appearances
Amateur
Junior Solheim Cup: 2002 (winners), 2003
Curtis Cup: 2004 (winners), 2006 (winners)
Espirito Santo Trophy: 2004

References

External links

Jane Park at SeoulSisters.com

American female golfers
UCLA Bruins women's golfers
LPGA Tour golfers
Winners of ladies' major amateur golf championships
Golfers from Chicago
Golfers from California
American sportspeople of Korean descent
Sportspeople from San Bernardino County, California
People from Rancho Cucamonga, California
1986 births
Living people